Krusheto is a village, located in Northern Bulgaria. The village is located in Gorna Oryahovitsa Municipality, Veliko Tarnovo Province. As of the 2020 census, the village has a population of 820 people with a current address registered in the settlement.

Geography 
Krusheto is located at an elevation of 147 meters. It is positioned in the northwest part of Municipality Gorna Oryahovitsa and its area borders with Veliko Tarnovo and Polski Trambesh.

The river Yantra passes through the area of the village, which makes the lands fertile and eligible for harvest and agriculture. Another river that passes near the village is Rositsa.

75% of the landmass of the village is an agricultural domain, while 10% remain forests and the settlement takes up only 9% of the land area.

Culture 
After the end of Ottoman Rule in Bulgaria, the village’s name changes from Armutli to Krusheto. Which means the same in both Turkish and Bulgarian languages - a place of Pear trees.

3 Kilometers west of the village an Agricultural institute can be found. It specializes in educating agricultural workers in the respective field.

Buildings 

 The church “Sveti Dimitar” was built in 1883.
 The Library and community center “Napredak” , was built in 1906 and is still active.

Ethnicity 
According to the Bulgarian population census in 2011.

References 

Villages in Veliko Tarnovo Province